Matthew Robert Martin Bennett (born 2 September 1982) is an English cricketer.  Bennett is a right-handed batsman who plays primarily as a wicketkeeper.  He was born in Epsom, Surrey.

Bennett represented England at under 18 level and played for Kent and Essex at second XI level. He also represented the Kent Cricket Board in 2 List A matches.  The first of these came against the Leicestershire Cricket Board in the 2nd round of the 2003 Cheltenham & Gloucester Trophy which was held in 2002.  His second and final List A match for the Board came against Derbyshire in the 3rd round of the same competition which was played in 2003.  In his 2 List A matches, he scored 41 runs at a batting average of 41.00, with a high score of 31.  Behind the stumps he made 2 stumpings.

He currently plays club cricket for Reigate Priory Cricket Club in the Surrey Championship.

References

External links
Matthew Bennett at Cricinfo
Matthew Bennett at CricketArchive

1982 births
Living people
Cricketers from Epsom
English cricketers
Kent Cricket Board cricketers
Wicket-keepers